Nucinella owenensis is a species of small, monomyarian, nuculoid bivalve.

It is suspected of benefiting from chemosymbiosis with sulphur-oxidizing bacteria.

References

Further reading
VOKES, HAROLD E. "A new species of the bivalve genus Nucinella from the Eocene of Louisiana." Tulane Studies of Geology and Paleontology 5 (1966): 38-40.
Allen, J. A. "Evolution of the deep sea protobranch bivalves." Philosophical Transactions of the Royal Society B: Biological Sciences 284.1001 (1978): 387-401.

External links
WORMS entry

Nucinellidae
Molluscs described in 2011